Antichiropus is a genus of millipede in the family Paradoxosomatidae. The genus is very distinctive in the form of the gonopod, which is typically coiled through at least a full circle. It is probably endemic to Australia. Some species have small ranges of less than 10000 km2, classifying them as short-range endemic invertebrates.

See also
Antichiropus fossulifrons (Attems, 1911) – Western Australia
Antichiropus humphreysi (Shear, 1992) – Western Australia
Antichiropus mammilifer (Jeekel, 1982) – South Australia
Antichiropus minimus (Attems, 1911) – Western Australia
Antichiropus monacanthus (Attems, 1911) – Western Australia
Antichiropus nanus (Attems, 1911) – Western Australia
Antichiropus sulcatus (Attems, 1911) – Western Australia
Antichiropus variabilis (Attems, 1911) – Western Australia
Antichiropus whistleri (Attems, 1911) – Western Australia

References

Polydesmida
Millipedes of Oceania
Endemic fauna of Australia